Karajabad (also Romanized as Karajābād; also known as Chīzābād) is a village in Sarajuy-ye Shomali Rural District of the Central District of Maragheh County, East Azerbaijan province, Iran. At the 2006 National Census, its population was 1,947 in 420 households. The following census in 2011 counted 2,220 people in 610 households. The latest census in 2016 showed a population of 2,325 people in 660 households; it was the largest village in its rural district.

References 

Maragheh County

Populated places in East Azerbaijan Province

Populated places in Maragheh County